Matt Kilcullen (born October 31, 1954) is an American Director of Athletics at Mercy College, formerly college basketball coach and athletics administrator at the University of North Florida. He served as head coach of men's basketball at four schools, Castleton State College (1979–1982), Jacksonville University (1991–1994), Western Kentucky University (1994–1998), and the University of North Florida (1999–2009), and was assistant coach at several others. He was the first coach of the North Florida Ospreys in their transition to Division I. In April 2009 he was relieved of his position by the university's new athletic director, Lee Moon, and subsequently took an administrative position in the school's athletics department. He was replaced as head coach by Matthew Driscoll.

Head coaching record

References

1954 births
Living people
American men's basketball coaches
American men's basketball players
Castleton Spartans men's basketball coaches
College men's basketball head coaches in the United States
Lehman Lightning men's basketball players
Jacksonville Dolphins men's basketball coaches
Lehman College alumni
Manhattan Jaspers basketball coaches
North Florida Ospreys men's basketball coaches
Notre Dame Fighting Irish men's basketball coaches
Place of birth missing (living people)
Siena Saints men's basketball coaches
Western Kentucky Hilltoppers basketball coaches